Food for Life may refer to:

 Hare Krishna Food for Life, a vegan and vegetarian food relief organization
 Yummy Yummy, a TV drama jointly produced by Singapore's SPH and Hong Kong's TVB
 Food for Life, a 2005 cookbook by chef Kevin Thornton
 Food for Life, a 1993 book by vegan activist Neal D. Barnard
 Food for Life, a 1952 book by neurophysiologist Ralph W. Gerard